is a singer, actress, and a former member of the idol group AKB48 under Team B.

Career

2007 
 On May 27, she passed AKB48 first trainee audition (AKB48 第一回研究生（4期生）オーディション).

2008 
 On March 4, it was announced she would become a Team K member at the himawari-group performance.

2009 
In June–July 2009, she was ranked 21st in the 2009 AKB48 Senbatsu Election.
During the AKB48 Bunshin no Jutsu Tour / AKB104 Senbatsu Members Sokaku Matsuri on August 23, 2009, it was announced that she is going to be part of Team A

2010 
In May–June 2010, she was ranked 23rd in the 2010 AKB48 Senbatsu Election.
With new team activities began on May 21st, officially became a member of Team A
On September 8, she debuted with Yuki Kashiwagi and Aki Takajō as French Kiss.

2011 
In May–June 2011, she was ranked 21st in the 2011 AKB48 Senbatsu Election.

2012 
In June 2012, she was ranked 22nd in the 2012 AKB48 Senbatsu Election.
During 1830m Concert and Tokyo Dome Team Shuffle, it was announced that she is transferred back to Team K
With new team activities began on November 1st, Became a member of Team K again
In December 2012, she took a brief hiatus due to acute tonsillitis.

2013 
In April 2013, it was announced she would be releasing her first solo single, Itsumo Soba ni, on May 29 under the major label Avex.
At AKB48 32nd Single Senbatsu General Election, Kuramochi ranked into 36th place, putting her into Next Girls

2014
At a AKB48 Group Grand Team Reshuffling Festival, Kuramochi was transferred to Team B and appointed captain

2015 
On July 18, Asuka announced that she will be graduating from AKB48 to pursue a career in sportscasting.  Her final performance day was on August 17.

2016
Appeared in the MBS/TBS drama, OL Desu ga, Kyabajou Hajimemashita (ＯＬですが、キャバ嬢はじめました) as Nanako Koizumi. It was her first appearance in the drama since graduating from AKB48

Solo Single Sales 
 Itsumo Soba ni Released 29 May 2013 - 31,424+

References

External links

 
 AKB48 official profile
 Asuka Kuramochi official blog「Dear」（March 7, 2011~）
 Asuka Kuramochi official blog 「Dear...」 （Previous blog、May 28, 2010 - March 6, 2011）
 Bisket Entertainment（Watanabe Entertainment）WE!マイページ:倉持明日香
 Asuka Kuramochi (English page) - Google+

1989 births
Living people
Japanese idols
AKB48 members
Avex Group artists
People from Yokohama
French Kiss (band)
21st-century Japanese women singers
21st-century Japanese singers
21st-century Japanese actresses
Watanabe Entertainment